The Case School of Dental Medicine (CSDM) is a graduate school of Case Western Reserve University. It is an American dental school located in Cleveland, Ohio. The Case School of Dental Medicine is a clinically oriented dental school. It has been ranked consistently high with its affiliated medical school. Admission to Case Dental School has an acceptance rate of 2.1%. Over 3700 applications for admission are received every year, and 300 applicants are interviewed for the limited 75 positions. The most recently admitted class had a mean undergraduate GPA of 3.61 and a mean DAT of 20 (~90th percentile).

In addition to the DMD (Doctor of Dental Medicine) degree, Case offers five specialty training programs:

The residency program in Oral and Maxillofacial Surgery is a 5-year dual degree (MD-DMD) program that is joint with the Case School of Medicine. The residents receive an MD (Doctor of Medicine) degree at the end of their residency years along with a certificate in Oral and Maxillofacial Surgery.

Endodontics, Periodontics, Orthodontics, and Pediatrics are master's degree programs (M.S.D.) with a certificate granted upon completion of the degree requirements.

General information
The Case School of Dental Medicine was organized in 1892 as the Dental Department of Western Reserve University. Since 1969 the facilities of the school of dentistry have been located in the Health Science Center of Case Western Reserve University adjacent to the schools of medicine and nursing and University Hospitals of Cleveland, Ohio. The School of Dental Medicine has conferred degrees on more than 4,200 graduates. Education in the basic sciences and techniques, as well as preclinical laboratory work, is carried out by each student in an individually assigned area in the multidisciplinary laboratories. The 50,000-square-foot dental clinic floor consists of two major clinics and five specialty clinics. The major clinics are made up of cubicles fully equipped as private operatories.

Notable alumni
Hom-Lay Wang
Holly Broadbent Jr.
Holly Broadbent Sr. 
Wendell L. Wylie

See also
American Student Dental Association

References

External links
 

Case Western Reserve University
Healthcare in Cleveland
Educational institutions established in 1892
Dental schools in Ohio
1892 establishments in Ohio